Nova Bréscia is a municipality in the state of Rio Grande do Sul, Brazil, settled by Italian immigrants from Brescia. Its estimated population in 2020 was 3,337 inhabitants.

Nova Bréscia is known as the capital of lies, making every two years the Festival of Lie. A person tries to tell the biggest lie, provided that it can leave the audience in doubt of its veracity.

Monument to the barbecue 

Nova Bréscia is also known for offering the world the best Brazilian barbecue in Brazil. The fame of the inhabitants is yielding to a very great tribute to the barbecue in the city center.

Gallery

See also
List of municipalities in Rio Grande do Sul

References

Municipalities in Rio Grande do Sul